The 2022–23 TCU Horned Frogs men's basketball team represented Texas Christian University during the 2022–23 NCAA Division I men's basketball season. The team was led by seventh-year head coach Jamie Dixon, and played their home games at Schollmaier Arena in Fort Worth, Texas as a member of the Big 12 Conference.

Previous season
The Horned Frogs finished the 2021–22 season 21–13, 8–10 in Big 12 play to finish in fifth place. As the No. 5 seed in the Big 12 tournament, they defeated Texas in the quarterfinals, before losing to Kansas in the semifinals. They received an at-large bid to the NCAA tournament as the No. 9 seed in the South Region, where they defeated Seton Hall in the first round before losing to Arizona in the second round in an overtime thriller. There is a small controversy regarding the final play in regular time during the game versus Arizona. Mike Miles looked like he had been fouled but the foul was not called. However, Miles could have attempted the free throw shots since there was a bonus. These shots would have sealed the game for a victory against Arizona.

With their win over Seton Hall in the first round, the Horned Frogs won their first NCAA tournament game since 1987.

Offseason

Departures

Incoming transfers

Recruiting classes

2022 recruiting class

2023 recruiting class

Roster

Schedule and results

|-
!colspan=12 style=|Exhibition

|-
!colspan=12 style=|Regular season

|-
!colspan=12 style=|Big 12 tournament

|-
!colspan=12 style=| NCAA Tournament

Source

Rankings

References

TCU Horned Frogs men's basketball seasons
TCU Horned Frogs
TCU Horned Frogs men's basketball
TCU